Dholmari is a village, in Deshapran CD block in Contai subdivision of Purba Medinipur district in the state of West Bengal, India.

Geography

CD block HQ
The headquarters of Deshapran CD block are located at Dholmari.

Urbanisation
93.55% of the population of Contai subdivision live in the rural areas. Only 6.45% of the population live in the urban areas and it is considerably behind Haldia subdivision in urbanization, where 20.81% of the population live in urban areas.

Note: The map alongside presents some of the notable locations in the subdivision. All places marked in the map are linked in the larger full screen map.

Demographics
As per 2011 Census of India Dholmari had a total population of 1,948 of which 1,011 (52%) were males and 937 (48%) were females. Population below 6 years was 218. The total number of literates in Dholmari was 1,531 (88.50% of the population over 6 years).

References

Villages in Purba Medinipur district